The following is a list of episodes for the NBC teen sitcom, Saved by the Bell. The series premiered on August 20, 1989 and ended on May 22, 1993 with 86 episodes produced spanning four seasons. The number of episodes was increased for syndication, adding re-purposed episodes of Good Morning, Miss Bliss (excluding the pilot), the follow-up series Saved by the Bell: The College Years, and the TV movies Saved by the Bell: Hawaiian Style and Saved by the Bell: Wedding in Las Vegas (broken into four episodes each). The total number of syndicated episodes is 126, though the number aired varies by broadcaster. The storyline follows Zack Morris through junior high, high school and college, to his eventual marriage to Kelly Kapowski. The related series Saved by the Bell: The New Class maintains a separate storyline.

Series overview

Good Morning, Miss Bliss (1987–89)

Episodes

Season 1 (1989)

Season 2 (1990)

Season 3 (1991)

Season 4 (1992–93)

Hawaiian Style (1992)

The College Years (1993–94)

Wedding in Las Vegas (1994)

See also
 List of Saved by the Bell: The New Class episodes

References

External links
 

Lists of American sitcom episodes
Lists of American children's television series episodes
Saved by the Bell episodes